The Red Forest is a sculpture by Konstantin Dimopoulos, installed in Denver, Colorado, U.S.

References

Outdoor sculptures in Denver